The Eastern Caribbean Central Securities Registry (ECCSR) is the Central Securities Depository for the securities traded on the Eastern Caribbean Securities Exchange (ECSE).

It is a wholly owned subsidiary of the ECSE, part of the Organisation of Eastern Caribbean States.

The depository is based in Basseterre in Saint Kitts and Nevis.

See also

References

External links 
 

Securities Registry
Central securities depositories
Securities clearing and depository institutions
International economic organizations
Organisations based in Saint Kitts and Nevis
Organisation of Eastern Caribbean States